Ammos is a settlement on the island of Othonoi, Greece. Ammos is the main port of the island. Ammos is the most populous settlement with small guesthouses, restaurants, rent-a-bike store, cafes, police station, community clinic with ambulance and port authority. There are also the Holy Trinity church (Greek: Εκκλησία Αγίας Τριάδος) (1892), the School of Othonoi (1912), the monument to the seafarers of Othonoi, and the monument to the World War II-era submarine Protefs.

References

Populated places in Corfu (regional unit)
Villages in Greece
Othonoi